Danielson Airport  is a state-owned public-use airport located two nautical miles (4 km) northwest of the central business district of Danielson, a borough in the town of Killingly in Windham County, Connecticut, United States. The smallest airport in the state, it is included in the Federal Aviation Administration (FAA) National Plan of Integrated Airport Systems for 2017–2021, in which it is categorized as a local general aviation facility.

Although most U.S. airports use the same three-letter location identifier for the FAA and IATA, this airport is assigned LZD by the FAA but has no assignment from the IATA.

Facilities and aircraft 
Danielson Airport covers an area of 257 acres (104 ha) at an elevation of 238 feet (73 m) above mean sea level. It has one runway designated 13/31 with an asphalt surface measuring 2,700 by 75 feet (823 x 23 m).

For the 12-month period ending October 31, 2011, the airport had 22,102 aircraft operations, an average of 60 per day: 99% general aviation, <1% air taxi, and <1% military. At that time there were 37 aircraft based at this airport: 89% single-engine, 8% glider, and 3% multi-engine.

The Connecticut Wing Civil Air Patrol 074th Cadet Squadron (NER-CT-074) operates out of the airport.

References

External links 
 Danielson Airport
 Aerial image as of April 1991 from USGS The National Map
 
 

Airports in Connecticut
Connecticut Airport Authority
Transportation buildings and structures in Windham County, Connecticut